Aurelio Janet was a Cuban Olympic javelin thrower. He represented his country in the men's javelin throw at the 1968 Summer Olympics. His distance was an 80.10 in the qualifiers and a 74.88 in the finals. He died in a car accident just 4 weeks after the Olympiad.

References

Cuban male javelin throwers
Olympic athletes of Cuba
Athletes (track and field) at the 1968 Summer Olympics
1945 births
1968 deaths
Road incident deaths in Cuba